Capital Cymru is a local Welsh-language radio station owned and operated by Global. The station broadcasts to Gwynedd and Anglesey from studios in Gwersyllt, Wrexham via the Arfon transmitting station.

Previously, the station formed part of the Heart network and earlier the Marcher Radio Group. It switched to the Capital network on 6 May 2014. Heart North Wales now covers the region as part of the Heart network.

Overview
Capital Cymru's programmes are almost entirely in Welsh—all local output is presented in Welsh and incorporates Welsh-language music, news bulletins and traffic updates. The only English-language programming and the only networked show is The Sky VIP Official Big Top 40, broadcast on Sunday afternoons.

Although the official transmission area takes in most of the Isle of Anglesey and a large part of Gwynedd (as far south as Harlech), the location of its transmitter means the signal carries across Cardigan Bay and can be heard in parts of Pembrokeshire and even in Ireland. Capital Cymru is also available on the North West Wales local DAB digital radio multiplex—broadcasting alongside the North Wales Coast feed of Capital North West and Wales, which continues to carry Capital's networked programmes.

History
When it launched in December 1998 as Champion 103, it was the first commercial radio station to serve Anglesey and Gwynedd as a whole, although Marcher Coast 96.3 had been broadcasting to a small part of the area for some time from its Colwyn Bay studios.

Originally owned and operated by the Marcher Radio Group, Champion 103 broadcast from studios at Parc Menai in Bangor, Gwynedd - later sharing its facilities with Coast 96.3. In 2000, the four Marcher stations - including Champion - were brought by the GWR Group and became part of The One Network.

In March 2009, following Global Radio's takeover of GCap Media, Champion was rebranded as Heart Cymru as part of a rollout of the Heart network across 29 local radio stations owned by Global. By this point, local programming had been reduced to ten hours on weekdays and seven hours at weekends.

In July 2010, Global closed the Bangor studios and moved Heart Cymru's operations to the former Marcher headquarters in Gwersyllt, near Wrexham. By this point, the three Heart stations serving North Wales Coast, Cheshire & North East Wales and the Wirral were merged into one regional station, Heart North West and Wales. Heart Cymru was not affected by the network restructuring.

On 6 February 2014, Global announced that Heart Cymru would be rebranded as Capital, with the North Wales licence of Real Radio Wales being sold to Communicorp and relaunched as a new separate Heart station for North and Mid Wales.

Capital Cymru was launched on 6 May 2014. All local output, including extended Welsh language shows, news bulletins and network opt-outs were retained.

On 23 May 2019, Capital Cymru dropped all of Capital's networked programming and introduced a full schedule of local output, including an additional Welsh-language daytime show. The station retains both the Capital branding and much of the network's Contemporary hit radio music playlist.

The Sky VIP Official Big Top 40, simulcast on Heart North Wales, continues to air on Sunday afternoons. Outside programming hours, the station broadcasts automated output, including a full hour of Welsh language music at 5am on weekday mornings.

Programming
The majority of Capital Cymru's output is produced and broadcast from Global's Wrexham studios - including presenter-led programming from 6am-7pm on weekdays, 9am-12pm on Saturdays and 9am-4pm on Sundays The Sky VIP Official Big Top 40 on Sunday afternoons originates from Global's London headquarters.

The station's local presenters are Alistair James (Capital Breakfast, Saturday mornings), Cerian Griffith (weekday daytime), Kev Bach (weekday afternoon), Megan Llŷn (Sunday mornings) and Owain Llyr (Sunday afternoons).

News
Capital Cymru broadcasts hourly localised news updates from 6am-7pm on weekdays and 6am-12pm at weekends. On weekdays, bulletins during local programming are broadcast in Welsh.

Global's newsrooms in Wrexham and Cardiff Bay produce the bulletins, alongside those for Capital North West and Wales and Heart North Wales.

See also 
List of Celtic-language media

References

External links
 

Radio stations in Wales
Marcher Radio Group
Welsh-language mass media
Bangor, Gwynedd
Radio stations established in 1998
Cymru
1998 establishments in Wales